The Lea County Correctional Facility (LCCF) is a medium-security prison for men located four miles north-west of Hobbs, New Mexico, opened in 1998 on 60 acres of the former Hobbs Army Airfield, now adjacent to the Lea County Regional Airport.  The facility can house 1200 state inmates of the New Mexico Corrections Department, and is operated by the private GEO Group under a contract administered through the county.

In its first year, LCCF was "the site of three fatal inmate stabbings, six nonfatal stabbings, a 'near-riot' and allegations of guards using excessive force, according to reports in both the Albuquerque Journal and Albuquerque Tribune."

In April 2002 the U.S. Department of Justice found three LCCF guards guilty of civil rights conspiracy and obstruction charges after assaulting a prisoner, then falsifying reports and lying to investigators.

In November 2011 the state of New Mexico imposed fines of $1.1 million against GEO Group for failing to maintain adequate staffing levels at LCCF.  In March 2012 the state imposed another fine of nearly $300,000 for the company's failure to properly staff guards and health care workers; some positions had remained vacant for two months or longer.

Notable inmates
Nehemiah Griego (born 1997) - perpetrator of the 2013 South Valley homicides
Nathaniel Jouett (born 2001) - perpetrator of the Clovis library shooting
David Parker Ray (1939-2002) - abductor and possible serial killer; died at LCCF

References

Prisons in New Mexico
Buildings and structures in Lea County, New Mexico
GEO Group
1998 establishments in New Mexico